The Pure Oil Service Station in Lavonia, Georgia, located at 56 West Ave., was built in 1935.  It was listed on the National Register of Historic Places in 1983.

It is a one-story brick building with a steep roof.  It was operated as a service station until the 1970s.

References

Gas stations on the National Register of Historic Places in Georgia (U.S. state)
National Register of Historic Places in Franklin County, Georgia
Buildings and structures completed in 1935